Don Bolsius (born 29 November 1998) is a Dutch professional footballer who plays as a winger for Italian  club Fidelis Andria.

Club career
Bolsius made his professional debut in the Eerste Divisie for FC Den Bosch on 21 October 2016 in a game against VVV-Venlo.

After having impressed with Kozakken Boys in the Tweede Divisie – a club he had moved to in 2018 – Bolsius rejoined Den Bosch in the summer of 2020. He made 28 appearances during the 2020–21 season, of which the majority was as a substitute. His contract was not extended after the season, making him a free agent. 

On 15 July 2021, he signed a two-year contract with Serie C club Fermana. On 31 January 2022, Bolsius joined Campobasso on loan.

On 18 July 2022, Bolsius moved to Fidelis Andria.

References

External links
 

1998 births
Living people
Sportspeople from 's-Hertogenbosch
Footballers from North Brabant
Dutch footballers
Association football forwards
FC Den Bosch players
Kozakken Boys players
Fermana F.C. players
S.S.D. Città di Campobasso players
S.S. Fidelis Andria 1928 players
Eerste Divisie players
Tweede Divisie players
Derde Divisie players
Serie C players
Dutch expatriate footballers
Dutch expatriate sportspeople in Italy
Expatriate footballers in Italy